Shawn Lawes (born 3 July 1993) is a Jamaican international footballer who plays for Waterhouse, as a defender.

Career
Lawes has played club football for Arnett Gardens, Barbican, Cavalier, Reno and Waterhouse.

He made his international debut for Jamaica in 2018.

References

1993 births
Living people
Jamaican footballers
Jamaica international footballers
Arnett Gardens F.C. players
Barbican F.C. players
Cavalier F.C. players
FC Reno players
Waterhouse F.C. players
National Premier League players
Association football defenders